{{DISPLAYTITLE:C19H22N2}}
The molecular formula C19H22N2 (molar mass: 278.39 g/mol) may refer to:

 Depramine
 Eburnamenine
 Methadone intermediate
 Pericine
 Triprolidine

Molecular formulas